Zbigniew Wachowicz (on 12 January 1972 in Radom, Poland) is a Polish footballer who plays as a defender. He currently plays for Radomiak Radom in the Polish Third League in Poland.

His former clubs include Legia Warsaw, Polonia Warsaw, Stomil Olsztyn and KSZO Ostrowiec. He had brief spells in Israel with Hakoah Maccabi Ramat Gan F.C. and Finland with RoPS.

References

1972 births
Living people
Polish footballers
Polish expatriate footballers
Veikkausliiga players
Legia Warsaw players
Polonia Warsaw players
KSZO Ostrowiec Świętokrzyski players
OKS Stomil Olsztyn players
Korona Kielce players
Radomiak Radom players
Rovaniemen Palloseura players
Hakoah Maccabi Ramat Gan F.C. players
Expatriate footballers in Israel
Expatriate footballers in Finland
People from Radom
Sportspeople from Masovian Voivodeship
Association football defenders